Over the Border may refer to:

 Over the Border (1922 film), lost silent American film
 Over the Border (1950 film), American film
 Over the Border (2006 film), South Korean film